The following is a list of golfers who have been top of the Official World Golf Ranking since the rankings started on April 6, 1986. As of March 19, 2023, Scottie Scheffler is the number one ranked golfer.

The rankings are based on a player's position in individual tournaments (i.e. not pairs or team events) over a "rolling" two-year period with a maximum of 52 tournaments. New rankings are calculated each week. During 2018, nearly 400 tournaments on 20 tours were covered by the ranking system. All players competing in these tournaments are included in the rankings. In 2022, 23 tours factored into the world rankings.

A total of 25 different golfers from ten countries spanning four continents have been ranked world number one. Five countries; the United States, England, Australia, Spain and Germany have had multiple world number ones. The United States has had nine golfers ranked number one, the most of any country.

Tiger Woods has spent the most consecutive weeks (281) and most total weeks (683) at the top of the rankings, and Tom Lehman the fewest total weeks, having spent just a single week at the top in April 1997. Three golfers have spent an entire calendar year atop the rankings: Nick Faldo (1993), Greg Norman (1996), and Woods (2000, 2001, 2002, 2003, 2006, 2007, 2008, 2009). Lee Westwood and Luke Donald are the only world number one golfers to have not won a major championship.

Number one ranked men
Note 1: In the first column, each number signifies the first time that golfer was ranked number one.
Note 2: In the "Cumulative total" column, each boldface number signifies total weeks as of the most recent time that golfer was ranked number one.

Weeks at number one
 

Order – indicates the sequence in which the players first reached number 1.Majors – number of major championships each player has won throughout his golfing career.

Weeks at number one by country
 

Order – indicates the sequence in which the country first had a number 1 player.Majors – number of major championships the country's world-ranked number 1 players have won throughout their golfing careers.Players – number of players from that country who have been world-ranked number 1.Top player – the player from that country who has spent most weeks as the world-ranked number 1 player.First player – the player from that country who was first to be world-ranked number 1 player, left blank if that country has only one such player.Latest player – the player from that country who was most recently world-ranked number 1 player, left blank if that country has only one such player.

Earlier number ones
Before the start of the Official World Golf Ranking in 1986, unofficial end of year world golf rankings were published by Mark McCormack in his World of Professional Golf annual from 1968 to 1985. McCormack's rankings listed Jack Nicklaus as the number one from 1968 to 1977, Tom Watson from 1978 to 1982 and Seve Ballesteros from 1983 to 1985.

See also
List of male golfers who have been in the world top 10

Notes

References
General

Specific

External links

World Number One male golfers
Golf rankings